Scotty Campbell is the Republican member of the Tennessee House of Representatives for the 3rd district, encompassing Mountain City, Johnson County, and parts of Sullivan County. 

Campbell first served from January 2011 until November 2012 after the House District seat was vacated by Rep. Jason Mumpower at the end of his last term. In November 2020, Campbell was elected back to the re-districted House District seat after Rep. Timothy Hill declined to run for re-election.

He is a professional wrestling promoter and owner of professional wrestling company Beside The Ring.

Biography
Scotty Campbell was born on February 21, 1984, in Johnson County.

Campbell interned as a 17-year-old teenager for Democratic politician Bob Clement during 2001.

Campbell later earned a Bachelor of Science degree from Cumberland University, and studied Public Policy at Tennessee State University.

Campbell worked as a 911 police/fire/EMS dispatcher and also as a morning radio talk show host with the WFHG 92.9 FM news/talk format radio station in the Tri-Cities, TN/VA region.

Campbell was a member of the Chambers of Commerce of  Bristol and Johnson County.

Campbell worked for four years as a legislative staffer in the Tennessee General Assembly for Republicans Diane Black, Brian Kelsey, Debra Maggart, and Tennessee Speaker of the House Kent Williams. 

He received anonymous threats during his campaign for the 3rd district. He became state Representative in January 2011.

Campbell has been a member of the Finance and Health and Human Resources committees.

During a committee hearing on a bill to criminalize drag shows and other "adult-oriented" performances in front of children, Campbell expressed concern that the bill might be too restrictive. "If we're having a professional wrestling show at a county fair, and some promoter decides to have a bra-and-panties match, is that potentially a crime under this legislation," he said. Campbell ultimately voted in favor of the bill.

Campbell has been a member of the Bristol Chamber of Commerce, Johnson County Chamber of Commerce, and Neva Volunteer Fire Department.

Personal life
Campbell is a Baptist.

On the June 24, 2013, edition of Monday Night Raw, Campbell danced with the WWE tag team Tons of Funk, as the winning bidder for a Hurricane Sandy Relief Fund fundraising auction.

Electoral history

2010

2020 

Campbell ran unopposed in the general election.

References

Living people
1984 births
People from Johnson County, Tennessee
Cumberland University alumni
Republican Party members of the Tennessee House of Representatives
Baptists from Tennessee